Sara Davis Buechner (born David Buechner; 1959) is an American concert pianist and educator currently based in Philadelphia, Pennsylvania.

Career
Buechner was born in Baltimore, Maryland, where she studied with Veronika Wolf Cohen, Reynaldo Reyes, and Mieczyslaw Münz. She attended the Juilliard School as a pupil of Czech pianist Rudolf Firkusny and later worked with both Byron Janis and Paul Badura-Skoda. In her twenties, she won major prizes at the Queen Elisabeth of Belgium International Piano Competition (1983), the Leeds International Piano Competition (1984), the Tchaikovsky International Piano Competition (6th prize, bronze medal 1986), and the Gina Bachauer International Piano Competition (1984, gold medal). Her 1984, debut at the 92nd Street Y in New York City received a glowing review in The New York Times, and she has had an active performance career since that time.

Buechner has been on the piano faculty at Temple University since 2016, and had previously served on the faculties of the University of British Columbia, the Manhattan School of Music and New York University. She was also an honorary Professor of the University of Shanghai from 2013 to 2016. She has edited books and music scores for Dover Publications, where she was chief music editor from 2009 to 2012.

Buechner is transgender, and has given talks and written about her experience as a role model for the LGBTQ community. Buechner wrote about her life experiences in a 2013 article in The New York Times.

Buechner has performed with different orchestras with an active repertoire of more than 100 concertos, and has given master classes on four continents.

Buechner is a Yamaha Artist, and has made many recordings for the Disklavier player system.

Discography
 Mujeres Españolas – Piano Works of Joaquin Turina (1992)
 The American Flute (1993) (with flutist Robert Stallman)
 Henry Martin: Preludes and Fugues (1990–92) (1994)
 Mozart: Piano Sonatas (1995)
 The Paradine Case – Hollywood Piano Concertos (1995)
 Bach-Busoni "Goldberg" Variations (1997)
 Miklos Rozsa: Complete Works for Solo Piano (1999)
 Stephen Foster: Complete Piano Works (2002)
 Rudolf Friml: Piano Music (2003)
 Bygone Days – Music for Violin and Piano by Rudolf Friml (2006) (with violinist Stephanie Chase)
 George Gershwin – Original Works and Transcriptions for Solo Piano (2005)
 Nineteen Rags of Joseph Lamb
 Variations and Other Works of Brahms and Dvorak
 Works of Busoni and Stravinsky
 Gershwin: Second Rhapsody/Addinsell: "Warsaw" Concerto
 Tchaikovsky: Piano Concerto No. 1, op. 23

References

External links
 Official site
 

1959 births
Living people
LGBT people from Maryland
Manhattan School of Music alumni
Manhattan School of Music faculty
Musicians from Baltimore
Transgender women musicians
Prize-winners of the Leeds International Pianoforte Competition
Prize-winners of the Gina Bachauer International Piano Competition
Academic staff of the University of British Columbia
20th-century American pianists
20th-century American women pianists
21st-century American pianists
Women music educators
21st-century American women pianists
Transgender academics
American women academics
Transgender musicians